The 2020–21 UEFA Nations League A was the top division of the 2020–21 edition of the UEFA Nations League, the second season of the international football competition involving the men's national teams of the 55 member associations of UEFA. League A culminated with the Nations League Finals in October 2021 to determine the champions of the competition.

Portugal were the defending champions, having won the inaugural 2019 finals. However, they failed to qualify for the 2021 finals after finishing second in their group behind France. None of the teams that had qualified for the previous UEFA Nations League Finals qualified for the 2021 edition.

France won the final 2–1 against Spain for their first UEFA Nations League title.

Format
Following a format change from the first season, League A was expanded from 12 to 16 teams. The league consisted of the top ranked UEFA members from 1–16 in the 2018–19 UEFA Nations League overall ranking, split into four groups of four. Each team played six matches within their group, using the home-and-away round-robin format on double matchdays in September, October and November 2020. The winners of each group advanced to the 2021 UEFA Nations League Finals, and the fourth-placed team of each group was relegated to the 2022–23 UEFA Nations League B.

The Nations League Finals was played in a knockout format, consisting of the semi-finals, third place play-off, and final. The semi-final pairings were determined by means of an open draw. Host country Italy was selected among the four qualified teams by the UEFA Executive Committee, with the winners of the final crowned as the champions of the UEFA Nations League. Though originally planned for 2–6 June 2021, the Nations League Finals were moved to October 2021 following the rescheduling of UEFA Euro 2020 to June and July 2021 due to the COVID-19 pandemic.

The four group winners were drawn into groups of five teams for 2022 FIFA World Cup qualification (in order to accommodate for the Nations League Finals).

Teams

Team changes
The following were the team changes of League A from the 2018–19 season:

The following team changes were initially set to occur in League A, but did not after no teams were relegated due to the format change by UEFA:

Seeding
In the 2020–21 access list, UEFA ranked teams based on the 2018–19 Nations League overall ranking, with a slight modification: teams that were originally relegated in the previous season were ranked immediately below teams promoted prior to the format change. The seeding pots for the league phase were confirmed 4 December 2019, and were based on the access list ranking.

The draw for the league phase took place at the Beurs van Berlage Conference Centre in Amsterdam, Netherlands on 3 March 2020, 18:00 CET. Each group contained one team from each pot.

Groups
The original fixture list was confirmed by UEFA on 3 March 2020 following the draw. On 17 June 2020, the UEFA Executive Committee adjusted the league phase schedule for October and November 2020 to allow for the completion of the UEFA Euro 2020 qualifying play-offs. Following the change, a revised schedule for the October and November 2020 fixtures was released by UEFA on 26 June 2020.

Times are CET/CEST, as listed by UEFA (local times, if different, are in parentheses).

Group 1

Group 2

Group 3

Group 4

Nations League Finals

The host of the Nations League Finals, Italy, was selected from the four qualified teams. The semi-final pairings were determined by means of an open draw on 3 December 2020, 17:30 CET, at the UEFA headquarters in Nyon, Switzerland. For scheduling purposes, the host team was allocated to semi-final 1 as the administrative home team.

Times are CEST (UTC+2), as listed by UEFA.

Bracket

Semi-finals

Third-place play-off

Final

Goalscorers

Overall ranking
The 16 League A teams were ranked 1st to 16th overall in the 2020–21 UEFA Nations League according to the following rules:
The teams finishing first in the groups were ranked 1st to 4th according to the results of the Nations League Finals.
The teams finishing second in the groups were ranked 5th to 8th according to the results of the league phase.
The teams finishing third in the groups were ranked 9th to 12th according to the results of the league phase.
The teams finishing fourth in the groups were ranked 13th to 16th according to the results of the league phase.

Notes

References

External links

League A